Kailashahar Airport  is a non-operational airport located at Kailashahar in the state of Tripura, India. The airport was shut down in mid 1990 due to lack of space.
In December 2021, A group of 6 Persons of Airport Authority of India (AAI) conducted a Survey to start the airport soon with an aim to facilitate operations at the airport under the UDAN regional connectivity scheme (RCS).

Airlines and destinations
There is currently no scheduled commercial air service to this airport.

References

External links
Kailashahar Airport at the AAI

Defunct airports in India
Airports in Tripura
Unakoti district